Carex scaposa, also known as hua ting tai cao in Chinese, is a tussock-forming species of perennial sedge in the family Cyperaceae. It is native to eastern parts of Asia.

Description
The sedge has a tufted habit and has a woody rhizome. It has tufted basal leaves along the length of the stem which can be shorter or longer than the culms.

Taxonomy
It was first described by the botanist Charles Baron Clarke in 1887 in Botanical Magazine. The type specimen was collected by Augustine Henry in China between 1884 and 1887. There are two varieties; Carex scaposa var. hirsuta and Carex scaposa var. scaposa. There are two synonyms; Carex pandanophylla and Carex scaposa var. marantacea.

Distribution
The plant is native to temperate areas in south eastern and south central parts of China, in Vietnam and Taiwan.

See also
List of Carex species

References

scaposa
Plants described in 1887
Taxa named by Charles Baron Clarke
Flora of China
Flora of Taiwan
Flora of Vietnam